Stutsman is a surname of German origin and may refer to:

 Enos Stutsman (1826–1874), American lawyer, politician, government official, and land speculator
 Sally Stutsman (born 1946), American politician
 Stutsman County, North Dakota, named  after Enos Stutsman

See also
 Stutzman
 Stutsman County Courthouse and Sheriff's Residence/Jail